Raiden is a fictional character in the Mortal Kombat fighting game series by Midway Games and NetherRealm Studios. Based on the Japanese deity Raijin, he is depicted as the god of thunder who possesses control over lightning. He debuted in the original 1992 game and has appeared as a playable character in every main installment of the series (including updates) alongside Scorpion.

In the storyline of the games, Raiden is the protector of Earthrealm. He fulfills his duty by selecting and training the warriors who defend Earthrealm from various threats, while also participating directly in the realm's defense. Raiden generally serves as a mentor figure to the franchise's heroes, although he sometimes assumes a darker role in the story, which sees him become more ruthless in his protection of the realm.

One of the franchise's central characters, Raiden has appeared in various related media outside of the Mortal Kombat games, including guest appearances in NBA Jam Tournament Edition (1995), NFL Blitz (1997), Unreal Championship 2 (2005), and Injustice 2 (2017). He has received a positive reception and is among the series' most popular characters.

Appearances

Mortal Kombat games
When Earthrealm was young, Raiden was its protector. He fought the rogue Elder God Shinnok, who wished to overthrow his fellow gods, in a war that threatened to destroy Earthrealm. With the aid of the Elder Gods, Raiden managed to defeat Shinnok, then banished him to the Netherealm and secured his amulet of power in a secret location — a Temple of the Elements tucked away in Nepal's highest mountains. Raiden charged four gods with guarding the amulet — the gods of Wind, Fire, Earth, and Water. When Bi-Han, the elder Sub-Zero, stole Shinnok's amulet from the temple for the sorcerer Quan Chi several millennia later, Raiden appeared before the Lin Kuei warrior and ordered him to enter the Netherealm to steal it back as his powers do not work there, lest Shinnok use it to free himself. Sub-Zero's mission was a success and Shinnok's threat was averted for a time. However, it was later revealed that Quan Chi had acquired the real amulet and gave Sub-Zero a counterfeit, which Raiden never realized.

In the original Mortal Kombat, Raiden is invited to compete in the titular tournament by its grandmaster sorcerer Shang Tsung. Raiden accepts and takes on a human form to compete. In Mortal Kombat II, watching events unfold from above, Raiden realizes Outworld emperor Shao Kahn's intentions. He warns the surviving members of the original tournament, Liu Kang and Kung Lao, of Shao Kahn's threat before venturing to Outworld. Despite Shao Kahn taking every soul on Earth as his own, Raiden was able to protect the souls of Liu Kang and other chosen warriors. Initially unable to participate due to the merger of Outworld and Earthrealm, Raiden sacrifices his immortality in order to help his chances against the Kahn after the Elder Gods refuse to assist him in Mortal Kombat Trilogy. In the end, Shao Kahn's forces are defeated and Earthrealm is restored to its original state.

In Mortal Kombat 4, following Outworld's failed invasion, Shinnok, with the aid of Quan Chi, again sought to rise from the Netherealm and conquer the other realms. However, with Liu Kang again uniting Earthrealm's warriors, Raiden's Forces of Light emerge successful. Now granted the status of Elder God, Raiden turns over his position as Earthrealm's protector to his brother, the wind god Fujin.

In Mortal Kombat: Deadly Alliance, Raiden could not interfere when the titular alliance of Shang Tsung and Quan Chi kill Liu Kang due to his Elder God status. Disgusted by his fellow Elder Gods for their refusal to intervene, Raiden relinquishes his position and gathers Kung Lao, Sub-Zero, Jax Briggs, Sonya Blade, Johnny Cage, and Kitana to stop the sorcerers. However, Raiden's allies except Sub-Zero are all slain.

In Mortal Kombat: Deception, Raiden confronts the Deadly Alliance himself. When Onaga, the Dragon King, enters the fray, Raiden momentarily sets aside his differences with the Deadly Alliance and assist them in their attempts to repel Onaga. Raiden releases his godly essence, resulting in an enormous explosion that kills the alliance, but fails to harm Onaga. Raiden's essence soon gathers again in Earthrealm, albeit corrupted and reformed into a darker variant of himself. Raiden has become furious with the way Earthrealm's inhabitants had treated their realm, which increases once he learns that Shujinko had foolishly unleashed the Dragon King. With his patience exhausted, Raiden chooses to take matters into his own hands. Exhuming Liu Kang's corpse, he takes it to an underground temple that belonged to the Houan, an ancient sect of necromancers whom he had destroyed centuries earlier, and revives his former ally. Liu Kang's reanimated corpse became the enforcer of Raiden's will as he sent it on a mission to wreak havoc on those he believed did harm to Earthrealm.

This caught the attention of Shinnok, who appears before Raiden and offers him an alliance. Despite being aware of the former's deceptive nature, Raiden accepts in an attempt to secretly uncover Shinnok's plans. Raiden's story is further expanded in the Konquest mode of Mortal Kombat: Armageddon, when he encounters Taven and reveals to him that he had struck a deal with Shao Kahn, agreeing to let the Emperor conquer and rule all other realms so long as Earthrealm was left alone. In return, Raiden agreed to hunt and eliminate Taven for the Kahn so that he could claim Blaze's godlike power for himself. Raiden confronts Taven, only to be defeated. Raiden would later fight against Shao Kahn when the two became the last surviving warriors. The latter emerged victorious, but the former was able to send a message to his past self before Shao Kahn could finish him off.

In the 2011 Mortal Kombat reboot, Raiden's past self receives an ominous vision from his future self and works to avert the events of Armageddon. Although he succeeds and kills Shao Kahn with the assistance of the Elder Gods, his decisions resulted in many of Earthrealm's defenders, including Liu Kang, being killed and turned into Quan Chi's undead revenants.

In Mortal Kombat X, Raiden and Fujin join forces to defend the sky temple from Shinnok, Quan Chi, and the revenants. In the process, they manage to defeat the fallen Elder God and trap him in his amulet as well as revive the fallen Jax, Sub-Zero, and Scorpion. Twenty years later, Raiden discovers Shinnok's amulet was stolen and works with Earthrealm's new defenders to retrieve it. However, he fails to stop Quan Chi from releasing Shinnok, who takes Raiden prisoner so he can corrupt Earthrealm's Jinsei. After Cassie Cage defeats the Elder God, she helps Raiden purify the Jinsei by drawing Shinnok's energy into him. Following this, Raiden confronts the Netherrealm's new rulers, Liu Kang and Kitana, and presents them with Shinnok's decapitated head to prove he will show no mercy to those who threaten Earthrealm.

In Mortal Kombat 11, having used Shinnok's amulet to become Dark Raiden once more, he leads an assault on the Netherrealm with the Special Forces to destroy their cathedral and succeed. In doing so however, he unknowingly angered the keeper of time and Shinnok's mother, Kronika, who decides to rewrite history to undo his interference. She creates a time storm that erases Dark Raiden from history, but brings a younger version of him from the past due to his being immortal. After learning of his future self's fate, Raiden works with the Special Forces, Kotal Kahn, and past versions of his allies to defeat Kronika, only to learn that the Elder Gods had been killed. As a result, Raiden slowly gives into his dark impulses and uses Shinnok's amulet to empower himself like his future self did. When his version of Liu Kang tries to stop him from attacking Scorpion, Raiden sees visions of other timelines where they fought and realizes Kronika manipulated them all because she fears his and Liu Kang's combined power. Once Kronika learns of this, she kidnaps Liu Kang, forcing Raiden and his allies to mount a rescue mission to save him. Along the way, he confronts Liu Kang's revenant and merges with him and the past Liu Kang to become Fire God Liu Kang, who goes on to defeat Kronika. Once he does so, a mortal version of Raiden joins Liu Kang to advise him on forging a new history since the battle took them to the beginning of time. In the DLC story expansion, Aftermath, the mortal Raiden attempts to stop Shang Tsung after he approaches them and claims they cannot use Kronika's Hourglass without her Crown of Souls, though Liu Kang allows the sorcerer to go back in time to retrieve a past version of it. While in the past, Shang Tsung works with the past Raiden and his allies to secure the Crown and attempt to save the future, though he betrays everyone during the final battle. When Raiden and Fujin try to stop him, the sorcerer defeats them and drains their souls while keeping their bodies alive for future use. In the expansion's bad ending, Raiden serves Shang Tsung in conquering the realms.

In the crossover fighting game Mortal Kombat vs. DC Universe, Raiden fights Shao Kahn until the former sends him into a portal that causes the latter to fuse with Darkseid and turn them into Dark Kahn, which in turn fuses the Mortal Kombat and DC Universes. Despite clashes with members of the Justice League, Raiden works with Superman to defeat Dark Kahn and undo the fusions; later imprisoning Darkseid in the Netherrealm. In his arcade ending, Raiden returns to his realm to find that exposure to his world's sun has weakened him greatly. Quan Chi offers him a jade amulet of unknown origin that can restore his powers. Raiden is given a choice between a life of servitude to the sorcerer or mortality.

Other games
Raiden also appears as a secret character in NBA Jam Tournament Edition, NFL Blitz, and Unreal Championship 2: The Liandri Conflict.

He was also included as a playable DLC guest character alongside Sub-Zero in Injustice 2. In his arcade ending for the game, after mysteriously being transported to the Injustice universe and defeating Brainiac, Raiden is warned by a dying-Doctor Fate that "armageddon is coming". To avert it, he helps found the Justice League Dark and becomes its leader.

Design
As designer John Tobias sought inspiration for more characters in Mortal Kombat, he visited the Field Museum of Natural History and in their Japanese artifacts display of the Asian antiquities wing, he found a statue of the Raijin,  and decided that the game needed a Japanese thunder god. On his research of the Raijin, Tobias decided to take in the deity's alternate spelling of Raiden, and seeing that the traditional Shinto Raijin was usually portrayed as a small, red-skinned demon-like creature that beats a drum to create thunder, opted to employ a different design. Tobias took inspiration from the character Lightning from the film Big Trouble in Little China, a lackey with the ability to ride and control lightning and wore a conical hat.

Raiden's name was spelled this way in all of the original arcade games and in every game since Mortal Kombat 4. However, the PC and console ports released until Mortal Kombat Trilogy, along with both movies and the TV series, changed the name to "Rayden", fearing the original spelling would lead to copyright issues from a shoot 'em up game called Raiden. Ed Boon personally hated that Acclaim spelled it with a Y.

In an interview featured in Deception, Ed Boon said that the hat that actor Carlos Pesina wore to portray the character in the earlier Mortal Kombat games was ruined as a result of Pesina repeatedly performing falls during production. Mortal Kombat and Deadly Alliance states that Raiden is seven feet tall, but his sprite was the same height as the other fighters. His coolie hat is his most recognizable feature, and he occasionally wields a quarterstaff that holds the power of thunder and lightning. The Chinese character for thunder, 雷, is visible on most of his costumes. A saya (katana scabbard) appears on Raiden's secondary costumes in Deadly Alliance, Deception, and Armageddon, but he is never seen actually using the sword. Raiden has electricity pulsating across his body in Mortal Kombat, Mortal Kombat 4, and Deadly Alliance. He has glowing white (occasionally blue) eyes, which glow red in Deception and Armageddon.

Raiden was voiced by Midway employee Jon Hey in the first two games. He became well known for yelling randomly while performing his "Torpedo" move (aka "the Superman move"). Fans originally believed that he was yelling in Japanese, while others believed it to be mangled English phrases such as "Your momma's from LA", or "Get back in the car". John Tobias revealed that Raiden was merely speaking gibberish and not actual Japanese, as it was originally intended.

According to the Konquest mode in Mortal Kombat: Deadly Alliance, Raiden has mastered all of more than 750 documented varieties of jujutsu, which is his secondary fighting style.

Gameplay
Raiden's Fatality in the original game, in which he obliterated his opponent's head with a lightning strike, was drastically altered in the Super NES version due to Nintendo's strict no-blood policy at the time. The decapitation was changed to the opponent simply turning into a gray pile of dust and a skull. In the same game, by using Raiden's finishing move on the final opponent in the third Endurance match, Goro appeared with a glitchy body that was the same shade of gray as the ashes of Raiden's defeated opponent.

Raiden was originally going to use his staff as a weapon already in Mortal Kombat II, but Midway was forced to omit it due to memory constraints. He was unplayable in Mortal Kombat 3 where he appeared in the attract mode to state that he was forbidden from participating in the game's conflict. He also appeared as part of Nightwolf's Friendship, which saw Nightwolf transform into Raiden alongside a Mortal Kombat II arcade cabinet. The Friendship would include one of two quotes, "I've never seen a Kano transformation", or "No, But I Can Do a Raiden Transformation", both of which were based on false reports that Kano was secretly playable in Mortal Kombat II and Raiden likewise in Mortal Kombat 3. After Raiden became playable in the update Mortal Kombat Trilogy, the Nintendo 64 version changed the Friendship.

Other media

Raiden appears in the Mortal Kombat comic books in his usual role as the guide and mentor of the Earthrealm warriors. He and Shang Tsung were often portrayed as bitter enemies, and he was forbidden from intervening in the mortals' affairs, as shown when Johnny Cage was to answer one of the questions in the Tao Te Zhan. However, in a departure from the storyline of the first game, he was not allowed to participate in the tournament in the miniseries Blood & Thunder, due to his godly status.

Raiden co-starred in his own three-issue miniseries Rayden & Kano. In this miniseries, it is stated that, while his fellow gods stay out of mortal affairs, Raiden never remains silent, and always tries to give the good side an advantage in the eternal struggle. Raiden saved Kano's life and attempted to give him a sword called "Ebbonrule", which drew strength from an evil man who turned to the side of good. Raiden hoped Kano would slay Shao Kahn using the sword's power, but Kano gave the sword to Shao Kahn instead in exchange for godlike powers, which left Raiden to realize that his actions would never tip the balance of good and evil. During the last Tournament Edition issue, Raiden commandeered the group of heroes in Shao Kahn's tournament. He ultimately sacrificed himself to save the team from an ambush by Kano, Kintaro, Goro and Smoke. Raiden was depicted as having two female servants, named Wynd and Rayne.

In the first Mortal Kombat movie, Raiden, who is played by Christopher Lambert, is disallowed from participating in the tournament, but remains the guiding god of thunder, bent on doing all within his power to help Earth's chosen warriors gain victory. His wardrobe consisted of a robe which hides his attire from the first game (his rain hat was worn only once at the beginning of the film). His eyes occasionally displayed his true nature and he was seen teleporting only once. Raiden also possessed a dry sense of humor that was sometimes lost on the other characters, often prompting him to apologize after making dry remarks. According to the 'Making of Mortal Kombat' published by New Line Cinema, Raiden's role was "to protect the Earth Warriors and make sure Shang Tsung's forces don't cheat to win". On the ship taking all tournament contestants to Tsung's island, Raiden informed the Earth warriors that he had looked into all their souls, and one of three would decide the outcome: Liu Kang, Johnny Cage or Sonya Blade. Raiden also appeared in the animated film Mortal Kombat: The Journey Begins as the guide of the protagonists voiced by Randy Hamilton.

Raiden was played by James Remar in the 1997 sequel, Mortal Kombat: Annihilation. He is much more involved in the action of the film, besting Shao Kahn and threatening to kill his generals in his first action scene. By consulting the Elder Gods, he sacrifices his immortality to reunite with Queen Sindel, closing Kahn's invasion of Earthrealm and violating the rules of Mortal Kombat. At the end of the film, Raiden is revealed as the brother of Shao Kahn and the son of Shinnok in the film's original storyline, which included both Raiden and Kahn sporting a dragon tattoo that was explained to be a family crest bestowed to his family's bloodline, and allowed its bearers to travel safely between realms. A fight scene he was planned to have with Sheeva was included in the shooting script, but it was eventually cut from the film; Raiden instead fought a pair of Saurians/Reptile clones (known in the promotion as "Raptors") while Sheeva died after being crushed by a falling cage. In the end, he became an Elder God in the place of his father.

Jeffrey Meek played Raiden in the live-action series Mortal Kombat: Conquest. Unlike his film and game incarnations, this Raiden is far more upbeat, with a sarcastic personality making him less aloof toward humans. He was Kung Lao's mentor since childhood, and constantly reminds the young warrior of his duty to find new fighters to protect Earthrealm and to prepare for the next Mortal Kombat tournament. Meek also played Shao Kahn in the show and the final episode featured a stand off between both characters played by the same actor.

Raiden was a regular in the 1996 animated series Mortal Kombat: Defenders of the Realm and was voiced by Clancy Brown (who had risen to fame portraying Christopher Lambert's nemesis in the 1986 movie Highlander). He was depicted in his Mortal Kombat II attire and retained the dry wit and sarcasm of his Conquest counterpart, clashing with Sonya and Jax in several episodes.

Raiden is one of the many re-imagined characters in Mortal Kombat: Legacy, featured in the sixth episode and portrayed by Ryan Robbins. He crashed landed to Earth to participate in the Mortal Kombat tournament, but he, unfortunately, landed within the bounds of a mental hospital. He is found by a young female patient named Blue, whom he befriends, and taken in by orderlies. After three months of therapy, his doctor believes that Raiden is still under the delusion that he is the God of Thunder, and constantly vomits a blue substance. He is swiftly lobotomized, but due to his supernatural abilities, recovers from it. He attempts to escape but is lobotomized once again. Blue finds him and locks the door to the room, and Raiden tells her to stab him. After a tearful goodbye, Blue stabs him, causing him to disintegrate into lightning and smoke. Raiden reappears elsewhere and takes his signature hat from an old Chinese man. David Lee McInnis plays Raiden in the 2013 second series of Mortal Kombat: Legacy questioning Johnny Cage if he's accepted his invitation as Cage himself got an offer last season via Shang Tsung.

David B. Mitchell voiced the role of Raiden in the 2020 animated movie Mortal Kombat Legends: Scorpion's Revenge and the sequel Mortal Kombat Legends: Battle of the Realms.

Tadanobu Asano portrays Raiden in the 2021 reboot film Mortal Kombat.

Raiden appears as an Easter Egg in Shazam! in where during a montage where Billy Batson is testing out his new superpowers as Shazam, there is a scene where and Freddy Freeman play Mortal Kombat X together and ironically, Billy plays as Raiden, which could potentially reference Shazam's power to shoot lightning bolts.

Raiden is parodied in Broforce as a playable character called Broden. Just like Raiden from Mortal Kombat, Raiden can shoot bolts of lightning from his hands, can shoot tornadoes and perform uppercuts. He is also apparently able of easily knocking out every boss in the game.

Reception

Raiden is often included on the list of the top characters of the Mortal Kombat franchise. He was ranked as the 10th best character from the series by UGO.com, who praised him as one of the iconic characters from the franchise. He was sixth in Game Revolution's ranking of top ten "old school" Mortal Kombat characters, noting him for his gibberish and the Fergality. In UGO's 2012 list of the top Mortal Kombat characters, Raiden placed fourth.

In 2011, UGO ranked his hat as the 14th coolest headgear in video games and commented "Kung Lao’s got a slick topper that he can also use as a weapon, but Lord Raiden’s conical straw hat is untouchable." It was ranked as having the fourth best headwear in video gaming by GamePro in 2009. In 2011, Paste listed Raiden's Fatality in the 2011 Mortal Kombat game as the sixth best from that game, and his Fatality from the original Mortal Kombat as the second-best from that game. In 2012, Complex ranked him as the 32nd "most dominant" fighting game character.

See also
List of deities in fiction
Sailor Jupiter

References

Fictional characters from Chicago
Deity characters in video games
Fantasy film characters
Fictional martial artists in video games
Fictional Nanquan practitioners
Fictional characters with immortality
Fictional characters with post-traumatic stress disorder
Fictional gods
Fictional jujutsuka
Fictional male martial artists
Fictional stick-fighters
Male characters in video games
Male superheroes
Mortal Kombat characters
Video game characters introduced in 1992
Video game characters who can teleport
Video game characters who use magic
Video game characters with electric or magnetic abilities
Video game protagonists